Shelekhovsky (masculine), Shelekhovskaya (feminine), or Shelekhovskoye (neuter) may refer to:
Shelekhovsky District, a district of Irkutsk Oblast, Russia
Shelekhovskoye Urban Settlement, a municipal formation which the town of Shelekhov in Shelekhovsky District of Irkutsk Oblast, Russia is incorporated as